Nuremberg North is an electoral constituency (German: Wahlkreis) represented in the Bundestag. It elects one member via first-past-the-post voting. Under the current constituency numbering system, it is designated as constituency 244. It is located in northern Bavaria, comprising the northern part of the city of Nuremberg.

Nuremberg North was created for the 1965 federal election. Since 2017, it has been represented by Sebastian Brehm of the Christian Social Union (CSU).

Geography
Nuremberg North is located in northern Bavaria. As of the 2021 federal election, it comprises the Stadtbezirke 01 through 13, 22 through 30, 64, 65, 70 through 87, and 90 through 95 from the independent city of Nuremberg North.

History
Nuremberg North was created in 1965. In the 1965 through 1998 elections, it was constituency 230 in the numbering system. In the 2002 and 2005 elections, it was number 245. Since the 2009 election, it has been number 244.

Originally, the constituency comprised the northern half of the city of Nuremberg. It acquired its current borders in the 2002 election.

Members
The constituency was first represented by Georg Kurlbaum of the Social Democratic Party (SPD) from 1965 to 1969, followed by fellow SPD member Hans Batz until 1980. Renate Schmidt of the SPD served one term from 1980 to 1983. Oscar Schneider of the Christian Social Union (CSU) was elected in 1983 and was representative until 1990, when former member Renate Schmidt regained it for the SPD and served another term. Dagmar Wöhrl of the CSU won it in 1994. Günter Gloser of the SPD was elected in 1998. Former member Wöhrl was then re-elected in 2002, and served until 2017. Sebastian Brehm was elected in 2017 and re-elected in 2021.

Election results

2021 election

2017 election

2013 election

2009 election

References

Federal electoral districts in Bavaria
1965 establishments in West Germany
Constituencies established in 1965
Nuremberg